Dicen Que El Tiempo is a 2007 Grammy Award nominated album and seventh studio album released by Jennifer Peña on February 27, 2007.  Dicen Que El Tiempo was a departure from Peña's previous albums which included material written and produced by A.B. Quintanilla, Rudy Pérez and Kike Santander who wrote previous hits like El Dolor De Tu Presencia and Hasta El Fin Del Mundo.  Peña served as a lead producer with shared credits for songwriting and musical production with Obie Bermúdez and Sebastian Krys.

In support of the album, MTVTr3s selected Peña as the Artist of The Month on February 7, 2007 with multiple TV slots which included co-hosting Mi-TRL and Los Hits and a special Jennifer Peña week. While co-hosting Mi-TRL Peña premiered the album's lead single Cómo Entender  in a live performance.  The album and the first single received minimal reception on radio and on the charts the album debuted at #16 on Billboards Top Latin Albums chart and the single peaked at #23 on Top Latin Tracks chart. A promotional tour kept Peña in the United States and Puerto Rico where the album was released.  Tuya was the album's most successful single reaching the #5 position on Billboards Top Latin Tracks.  Sales stalled at 100,000 copies and the album is currently out of print. With  Dice Que El Tiempo Peña received her third Grammy Nomination for Best Latin Pop Album.  Her previous nominations were in the  Mexican-American category for her albums Abrázame y Bésame and  Libre. To date this is her final studio album.

Track listing

Album credits
Executive producer : Jennifer Peña 
Producer: Sebastian Kyrs 
Producer: Obie Bermúdez

Awards and recognition
 2007 Grammy Award: Best Latin Pop Album Nominated
 2007 Latin Grammy Award: Best Musical Production Won

References

http://www.voymusic.com/radio/news-50801-jennifer_pena_returns_with_the_february_27th_release_of_dicen_que_el_tiempo

2007 albums
Jennifer Peña albums
Albums recorded at Q-Productions